Williston is an unincorporated community and census-designated place in northern Allen Township, Ottawa County, Ohio, United States, located along State Route 579. It is located in the northwestern part of the state, near Toledo. Its ZIP code is 43468.  Its population was 211 people, according to the 2000 Census. The town received regional attention with the arraignment of a local bank robbery suspect from Williston, accused of robbing the Genoa Banking Company's Millbury branch, in federal court.

Local teenagers attend Genoa Area High School.

Demographics

References

Unincorporated communities in Ottawa County, Ohio
Unincorporated communities in Ohio
Census-designated places in Ottawa County, Ohio
Census-designated places in Ohio